Harriet Goodhue Hosmer (October 9, 1830 – February 21, 1908) was a neoclassical sculptor, considered the most distinguished female sculptor in America during the 19th century. She is known as the first female professional sculptor. Among other technical innovations, she pioneered a process for turning limestone into marble. Hosmer once lived in an expatriate colony in Rome, befriending many prominent writers and artists.

She was a cousin of poet William H. C. Hosmer and tragic actress Jean Hosmer.

Biography

Early life and education

Harriet Hosmer was born on October 9, 1830 at Watertown, Massachusetts, and completed a course of study at Sedgewick School in Lenox, Massachusetts. Her mother and three siblings died during her childhood. She was a delicate child, and was encouraged by her father, physician Hiram Hosmer, to pursue a course of physical training by which she became expert in rowing, skating, and riding. He also encouraged her artistic passion. She traveled alone in the wilderness of the western United States, and visited the Dakota Indians.

She showed an early aptitude for modeling, and studied anatomy with her father. Through the influence of family friend Wayman Crow she attended the anatomical instruction of Dr. Joseph Nash McDowell at the Missouri Medical College (then the medical department of the state university).  She then studied in Boston and practiced modeling at home until November 1852, when, with her father and her lover Charlotte Cushman, she went to Rome, where from 1853 to 1860 she was the pupil of the Welsh sculptor John Gibson, and she was finally allowed to study live models.

Rome 
While living in Rome, she associated with a colony of artists and writers that included Nathaniel Hawthorne, Bertel Thorvaldsen, William Makepeace Thackeray, the philosopher and feminist Frances Power Cobbe and the two female Georges, Eliot and Sand. When in Florence, she was frequently the guest of Elizabeth Barrett and Robert Browning at Casa Guidi.

The artists included Anne Whitney, Emma Stebbins, Edmonia Lewis, Louisa Lander, Margaret Foley, Florence Freeman, and Vinnie Ream. Hawthorne was clearly describing these in his novel The Marble Faun, and Henry James called them a "sisterhood of American ‘lady sculptors'." As Hosmer is now considered the most famous female sculptor of her time in America, she is credited with having 'led the flock' of other female sculptors. Frances Power Cobbe argued that the case of Hosmer showed that women could be creative artistic geniuses, just as much as men, and that Hosmer's work was pioneering a new women's art that celebrated female strength and power.

Artistic style 

Hosmer was drawn to the Neoclassical style, which was easy to study given her presence in Rome. She enjoyed studying mythology, and she created various representations of mythological icons, such as the sculpture of The Sleeping Faun, which includes intricate details of elements such as his hair, the grapes, and the cloth draped over him.

Later life
She also designed and constructed machinery, and devised new processes, especially in connection with sculpture, such as a method of converting the ordinary limestone of Italy into marble, and a process of modeling in which the rough shape of a statue is first made in plaster, on which a coating of wax is laid for working out the finer forms.

Hosmer later lived in Chicago and Terre Haute, Indiana.

Hosmer exhibited her sculpture of Queen Isabella, commissioned by the Queen Isabella Association, in the California State Building at the 1893 World's Columbian Exposition in Chicago, Illinois. The statue was exhibited again in 1894 at the California Midwinter International Exposition.

For 25 years she was romantically involved with Louisa, Lady Ashburton, widow of Bingham Baring, 2nd Baron Ashburton (died 1864). Lady Ashburton provided Harriet a studio close to the Ashburton home in Knightsbridge, London.

Hosmer died at Watertown, Massachusetts, on February 21, 1908, and is buried in the family plot at Mount Auburn Cemetery, Cambridge. Aside from the work she produced, Harriet Hosmer made her mark on art history and feminist and gender studies. As the National Museum of Women in the Arts put it, "Harriet Goodhue Hosmer defied 19th-century social convention by becoming a successful sculptor of large scale, Neoclassical works in marble."

Context 

In the 19th century women did not usually have careers, especially careers as sculptors. Women were not allowed to have the same art education as men, they were not trained in the making "great" art such as large history paintings, mythological and biblical scenes, modeling of figure.  Women usually produced artwork that could be done in their home, such as still lives, portraits, landscapes, and small scale carvings, although even Queen Victoria allowed her daughter, the Princess Louise, to study sculpture.

Hosmer was not allowed to attend art classes because working from a live model was forbidden for women, but she took classes in anatomy to learn the human form and paid for private sculpture lessons. The biggest career move she made was moving to Rome to study art. Hosmer owned her own studio and ran her own business. She became a well-known artist in Rome, and received several commissions.

Hosmer commented on her break from tradition by saying "I honor every woman who has strength enough to step outside the beaten path when she feels that her walk lies in another; strength enough to stand up and be laughed at, if necessary."

Legacy
Mount Hosmer, near Lansing, Iowa is named after Hosmer; she won a footrace to the summit of the hill during a steamboat layover during the 1850s.

During World War II the Liberty ship  was built in Panama City, Florida, and named in her honor.

A book of poetry, Waking Stone: Inventions on the Life Of Harriet Hosmer, by Carole Simmons Oles, was published in 2006.

Her sculpture, Puck and Owl, is featured on the Boston Women's Heritage Trail.

The Hosmer School in Watertown, Massachusetts is a public elementary school. It was built on land donated by Harriet’s father, Dr. Hiram Hosmer. The school was originally dedicated to both Hiram and Harriet’s cousin Dr. Alfred Hosmer in honor of their years of service to the community. On February 1, 2022 to mark the occasion of the opening of the newly renovated school, the town of Watertown rededicated the building to include Harriet. From the rededication ceremony; “This change is not to exclude, demote, nor snub the Doctors Hiram and Alfred Hosmer, rightly honored for their combined decades of service to the town, but rather to include Harriet, internationally famous even in her own time when women had fewer outlets for publicly acknowledged accomplishments. Harriet was present for the dedication of the first building, named for her father and her cousin. It is time she is equally recognized.”

Selected works

Hosmer made both large and small scale works and also produced work to specific order. Her smaller works were frequently issued in multiples to accommodate demand. Among her most popular were 'Beatrice Cenci', which exists in several versions.

 Hesper, The Evening Star, her first original sculpture (1852)
 Doctor McDowell, a portrait of a man who had a great impact on Hosmer's professional life (1852)
 Clasped Hands of Robert and Elizabeth Barrett Browning (1853)
Daphne and Medusa, ideal heads (1853)
 Puck (1855), a spirited and graceful conception which she copied for the Prince of Wales, the Duke of Hamilton and others
Oenone (1855), her first life-sized figure, now in the Saint Louis Art Museum
 Will-O-The-Wisp, three known variations (1856, 1858, 1864)
Beatrice Cenci (1857), which exists in several versions, including one in the St. Louis Mercantile Library and one in the Art Gallery of New South Wales
Zenobia, Queen of Palmyra (1857), Art Institute of Chicago
 Lady Constance Talbot, "the only known Hosmer medallion that is a bas relief portrait of a woman" (1857)
 Tomb of Judith Faconnet, the first American-made artwork that is now permanently installed in Sant'Andrea della Fratte (1857 - 1858)
 The Fountain of the Hylas and the Water Nymphs (1858)
Zenobia (1859), owned by the St. Louis Art Museum in St. Louis, Missouri
 The Fountain of the Siren, her most well known fountain design (1861)
 Thomas Hart Benton, the first public monument in the state of Missouri (1862)
 Gate for an Art Gallery (1864)
A Sleeping Faun (1865) is now being displayed at the Museum of Fine Arts, Boston. Another version is in Iveagh House, Dublin, see Homan Potterton, 'An American Sculpture at the Dublin Exhibition of 1865: Hariet Hosmer's Sleeping Faun''', The Arts in Ireland Autumn 1973.
 Portrait of Wayman Crow (1866), John Gibson (1866)A Waking Faun; a bronze statue of Thomas H. Benton (1866 - 1867) for Lafayette Park, St. Louis. It was created as a companion to "The Sleeping Faun".
 Lincoln Memorial, sometimes known as "Freedmen's Monument" (1867 - 1868)
 Queen of Naples, "the second of the three full size statues of celebrated female sovereigns Hosmer chose to represent over the course of her career"  (1868)
 Sentinel of Pompeii (1878)
 Crerar Lincoln Memorial - The African Sibyl, made in attempt to win a Lincoln Memorial competition (1888 - 1896)
Bronze gates for the Earl of Brownlow's art gallery at Ashridge Hall.
 The Staghound, commissioned by the Empress of Austria
 Dolphin Fountain (1892), the male companion to Hosmer's The Mermaid's Cradle, Hosmer's only remaining complete fountain (1892 - 1893)
 Queen Isabella of Castile, Hosmer's last known completed work that was commissioned by the Daughters of Isabella (1893)
An alternate Emancipation Memorial—designed but not constructed
Statues of the queen of Naples as the heroine of Gaeta, and of Queen Isabella of Spain for the Columbian Exposition, Chicago, 1893.

Gallery

 References 

 Additional sources 
 
Culkin, Kate. Harriet Hosmer: A Cultural Biography.  Amherst: University of Massachusetts Press, 2010.

Further reading
Colbert, Charles. Harriet Hosmer and Spiritualism. American Art, Vol. 10, No. 3 (Autumn, 1996), pp. 28–49
Cronin, Patricia; preface by Maura Reilly and an essay by William H. Gerdts. (2009). Harriet Hosmer: Lost and Found, A Catalogue Raisonné''. Milan: Edizioni Charta. .
Culkin, Kate. Harriet Hosmer: A Cultural Biography. Amherst, MA: University of Massachusetts Press, 2010.

External links

 
The Winterthur Library  Overview of an archival collection on Harriet Hosmer.
 Hosmer, Harriet; Carr, Cornelia. Harriet Hosmer letters and memories (1913) (Internet Archives).
 Artcyclopedia entry for Harriet Hosmer
 Harriet Goodhue Hosmer, 1830-1908. A Finding Aid . Watertown Free Public Library, Watertown, MA 2008
 Entry for Harriet Hosmer in the Union List of Artist Names
Papers, 1834-1959. Schlesinger Library, Radcliffe Institute, Harvard University.
Harriet Hosmer video from The Life and Times of Missouri's Charles Parsons: Between Art and War https://www.youtube.com/watch?v=6nHepjd_FGM

1830 births
1908 deaths
American women sculptors
LGBT people from Massachusetts
People from Watertown, Massachusetts
Sculptors from Massachusetts
Burials at Mount Auburn Cemetery
19th-century American sculptors
20th-century American sculptors
20th-century American women artists
19th-century American women artists
American lesbian artists